Anacharis zealandica, the lacewing parasitoid wasp, is a native New Zealand species, also present in southeastern Australia, that parasitises lacewings like Micromus tasmaniae and Drepanacra binocula.

References

Cynipoidea